Tom O'Reilly is an Irish Republican politician.

O'Reilly first stood as a Sinn Féin candidate for Fermanagh District Council in 1997 and was first elected in 2001. He was re-elected in 2005 and 2011.  At the 2003 Northern Ireland Assembly election, he was elected in Fermanagh and South Tyrone, although he chose to stand down at the 2007 election. In 2014 O'Reilly was elected onto the new Fermanagh and Omagh District Council. O'Reilly was chosen by the members of Fermanagh and Omagh District Council to be the first Chairperson of the new Council.

References
Fermanagh District Council Elections 1993–2011

Year of birth missing (living people)
Living people
Northern Ireland MLAs 2003–2007
Sinn Féin MLAs
Sinn Féin councillors in Northern Ireland
Members of Fermanagh District Council
Councillors in County Tyrone